Fayandar (also Romanized as Fāyandar; also known as Fanidar and Pā’īn Dar) is a village in Miyan Khaf Rural District, in the Central District of Khaf County, Razavi Khorasan Province, Iran. At the 2006 census, its population was 1,161, in 207 families.

References 

Populated places in Khaf County